is a 2014 Japanese science fiction anime television series based on Sunrise's long-running Gundam franchise, and a sequel to the 2013 series Gundam Build Fighters. Like its predecessor, and in contrast to other Gundam series, Gundam Build Fighters Try features a tournament-based storyline where Gunpla models are built, customized, and battled.

The series is directed by Shinya Watada and written by Yousuke Kuroda, who wrote the first series. Character designs were done by both Kenichi Ohnuki and Suzuhito Yasuda. The series was officially unveiled by Bandai on May 15, 2014, and began airing on TV Tokyo in Japan while streaming on YouTube in limited areas internationally on October 8, 2014. Both songs debuted in episode 14.

Episodes

Gundam Build Fighters Battlogue

References

Gundam Build Fighters Try
Build Fighters Try